Mauricio Javier Ferradas (born 5 November 1979) is an Argentine footballer.

Club career
Ferradas previously played for Deportivo Cuenca in Serie A de Ecuador.

References

External links
 Argentine Primera statistics  
 
 Statistics at BDFA 

1979 births
Living people
Argentine footballers
Argentine expatriate footballers
Sportspeople from Buenos Aires Province
Association football forwards
Ecuadorian Serie A players
Club Almagro players
Club Atlético Platense footballers
Racing Club de Avellaneda footballers
C.D. Cuenca footballers
Gimnasia y Esgrima de Jujuy footballers
Club Atlético Sarmiento footballers
Independiente Rivadavia footballers
Expatriate footballers in Ecuador